Wendlandiella is a genus of one species of palms found in Peru, Bolivia and Acre state in Brazil. The genus is named after Hermann Wendland. 

The only recognized species is Wendlandiella gracilis. It is dioecious, with male and female flowers on separate individuals. It has three varieties, regarded as distinct species by some authors:

 Wendlandiella gracilis var. gracilis – Acre, northern Peru
 Wendlandiella gracilis var. polyclada (Burret) A.J.Hend. – northern Peru
 Wendlandiella gracilis var. simplicifrons (Burret) A.J.Hend. – Peru, Bolivia

References

Chamaedoreeae
Monotypic Arecaceae genera
Flora of South America
Dioecious plants
Taxa named by Carl Lebrecht Udo Dammer